Victorino Chermont (24 April 1973 in Rio de Janeiro – 28 November 2016 in La Unión) was a Brazilian sports journalist and television presenter. Chermont died in the crash of LaMia Airlines Flight 2933 on 28 November 2016 while covering the Associação Chapecoense de Futebol team for Fox Sports.

Victorino Chermont worked for Rede Bandeirantes in Rádio Globo, SporTV and Fox Sports Brazil. On this channel he presented A Última Palavra (The Final Saying).

He received several awards including the Botequim Prize for best sports journalist in 2012.

References

1973 births
2016 deaths
Brazilian sports journalists
Victims of the LaMia Flight 2933 crash
People from Rio de Janeiro (city)